Roelof van Vries (1631, Haarlem – 1681-1701, Amsterdam), was a Dutch Golden Age painter.

Biography
According to the RKD he is known for landscapes in the manner of more famous Haarlem landscapists such as Jacob van Ruisdael, Meindert Hobbema, Jan Wynants and Philips Wouwerman. He mostly signed his works as Rvries. He is considered the same person as the painter Roelandt van Vries who entered the Leiden Guild of St. Luke in 1653. He entered the Haarlem Guild of St. Luke in 1657. He got married in Amsterdam in 1659, then 28 years old, and Reynier Hals was his witness.

The year of his death is unknown, but his latest signed work was in 1681, and he is listed as dead in a list of guild members by Vincent van der Vinne in 1702, so he died before that. Staffage in his works has sometimes been attributed to other painters.

References

Roelof van Vries on Artnet

1631 births
1690s deaths
Dutch Golden Age painters
Dutch male painters
Artists from Haarlem
Painters from Haarlem
Painters from Leiden